The North Macedonia men's national under-16 basketball team is a national basketball team of North Macedonia, administered by the Basketball Federation of North Macedonia. It represents the country in men's international under-16 basketball competitions.

FIBA U16 European Championship participations

See also
North Macedonia men's national basketball team
North Macedonia men's national under-18 basketball team

References

External links
Official website 
Archived records of North Macedonia team participations

Basketball in North Macedonia
National sports teams of North Macedonia
Men's national under-16 basketball teams